Clarence Alvin Bowman is an American academic and former President of Illinois State University (ISU). He was trained in, and still teaches upper-level classes in, speech pathology.

Bowman, an African-American, received a bachelor's degree in speech pathology from Augustana College in 1975, a Master's in speech-language pathology from Eastern Illinois University in 1976 and a PhD in speech and hearing science at University of Illinois in 1979. He started his academic career with ISU in 1978 as a faculty member in the Department of Speech Pathology and Audiology (now the Department of Communications Sciences and Disorders) and in 1994 he was appointed chair of the department, as well as director of Down Syndrome Speech-Language Clinic. In 2002, Bowman left the chair position to serve as Illinois State's interim provost. He was named President of ISU in March 2004 following a vote by the Board of Trustees.

His wife, Linda Bowman, is an adviser and faculty member in the graduate division of the Department of Communications Sciences and Disorders. He and Linda have two daughters, Laura and Natalie.

He announced his retirement in December 2012.

References

External links

Living people
Presidents of Illinois State University
Augustana College (Illinois) alumni
Eastern Illinois University alumni
University of Illinois Urbana-Champaign alumni
African-American academics
1953 births
21st-century African-American people
20th-century African-American people